Love Thy Neighbour is a British reality television series that aired on Channel 4 in spring 2011. The series presents twelve families competing to win a house in Grassington, at the gateway to the Yorkshire Dales. At the end of each episode the villagers get to vote on who they think deserves to win the prize.

There were six episode in which two families were pitted against each other in an effort to convince the villagers that they were the right people to win the house.

These were followed by the semi-final in which all six remaining families battle it out to for a place in the final. All of the six families had previously won a heat, and secured a vote of confidence from the locals. They now had to fight against each other in a week-long contest.

In the final the last two families battled it out in a week-long contest for the cottage which proved both physically and emotionally draining to both families and resulted in the tightest of results.

References

External links 
 Love Thy Neighbour (Channel 4)

2011 British television series debuts
Channel 4 reality television shows
Television shows set in Yorkshire
Wharfedale